Indus College of Education, Asthal Bohar is a non-profit recognized college in Asthal Bohar on the outskirts of Rohtak city in Haryana, India. The school has well equipped laboratories, libraries, computer rooms, classroom and sports facilities.

History
The school was founded by politician and philanthropist Captain Abhimanyu, as one of the educational institutions under the auspices of the Sindhu Education Foundation and Param Mitra Manav Nirman Sansthan.

Affiliation
The school is affiliated with National Council for Teacher Education (NCTE), Jaipur and Maharshi Dayanand University (MDU), Rohtak.

References

External links
 Sindhu Education Foundation - Official Website
 Param Mitra Manav Nirman Sansthan - Official Website

Education in Rohtak
Universities and colleges in Haryana